Wartenberg may refer to:

Buildings 
 Wartenberg castles, situated on the Wartenberg hill in the municipality of Muttenz near Basel
 Wartenberg Castle built in the present day Kaiserslautern and destroyed in 1522; former seat of Counts of Wartenberg
 Wartenberg station, an S-Bahn and railway station in the Lichtenberg district of Berlin
 , German schloss built by Otto Wächter in Krakau

Places 
 Wartenberg, Hesse in the district Vogelsbergkreis, Hesse, Germany
 Wartenberg (Berlin), a locality in the borough of Lichtenberg in Berlin, Germany
 Wartenberg, Bavaria in the district Erding, Upper Bavaria, Germany
 Wartenberg (Swabian Jura), a mountain in Baden-Württemberg, Germany
 Wartenberg am Rollberg, the German name of Stráž pod Ralskem, Czech Republic
 The medieval County of Wartenberg, a fief of the Holy Roman Empire, mediatised to Kingdom of Westphalia in 1806 and subsequently to Prussia in 1814
 Otyń, a town in Poland (German: Deutsch-Wartenberg)
 Syców, a town in Poland (German: Polnisch-Wartenberg until 1888, then Groß-Wartenberg)
 Chełm Dolny, a village in Poland
 Jadowniki Bielskie, a village in Poland
 Parsów, a village in Poland

People 
 Franz Wilhelm von Wartenberg (1593-1661), Count, Catholic clergy, Prince-Bishop of Minden, Osnabrück and Verden as well as Vicar Apostolic of the Archdiocese of Bremen
 Ludolf von Wartenberg (born 1941), politician (CDU)
 Robert Wartenberg (1887-1956), neurologist
 Counts of Wartenberg, (since 1802 known as Counts of Wartenberg-Roth) an aristocratic family from Rhenish Hesse, Palatine and Upper Swabia
 Counts of Wartenberg of the Wittelsbach dynasty, aristocratic title given to the descendants of Ferdinand of Bavaria (1550-1608)
 , extinct aristocratic family from Bohemia

Other 
 Wartenberg wheel, a medical device for neurological use